Sparekassen for Store Heddinge og omegn (lit. The Savings Bank for Store Heddinge and Surroundings) was founded in 1839 in Store Heddinge, Denmark. Its former headquarters at Algade 11, a building from 1925, was listed on the Danish registry of protected buildings and places in 2003.

History
Store Heddinge Savings Bank was founded in 1839. A new bank building was constructed in 1898 to design by Aage Lauritzen. The bank moved again when a new building at Algade 11 was inaugurated in 1925.

See also
Sparekassen for Hjørring By og Omegn

References

External links
 Nørgaard, E. :Sparekassen for Store-Heddinge Og Omegn: En Skitse Udgivet Som Festskrift i Anledning Af Hundredeaarsdagen for Sparekassens Stiftelse Den 30. Juni 1839 Af Sparekassens Bestyrelse : 1839-30. Juni-1939 (1939)

Defunct banks of Denmark
Danish companies established in 1839
Listed bank buildings in Denmark
Listed buildings and structures in Stevns Municipality
Commercial buildings completed in 1926